William or Bill Davidson may refer to:

Businessmen
 Bill Davidson (businessman) (1922–2009), Michigan businessman and sports team owner
 William Davidson Institute, University of Michigan, named in honor of Bill Davidson
 William Davidson (lumberman) (1740–1790), Scots-Canadian pioneer

Politics
 Sir William Davidson of Curriehill (1614/15–c. 1689), Scottish merchant and member of the Privy council
 William Davidson (congressman) (1778–1857), member of the United States House of Representatives from North Carolina
 William Davidson (Pennsylvania representative) (1783–1867), Pennsylvania politician
 William Davidson (conspirator) (1781–1820), Jamaican-born British radical executed for his part in the Cato Street Conspiracy
 William McCartney Davidson (1872–1942), Canadian journalist, politician, and author
 William H. Davidson (lieutenant governor) (fl. 1836–1838), Lieutenant Governor of Illinois
 William Davidson (British Columbia politician) (fl. 1867–1907), Scottish-born miner and political figure in British Columbia

Engineering
 William Davidson (engineer) (1844–1920), Australian civil engineer
 William Soltau Davidson (1846–1924), New Zealander, pioneer of refrigerated shipping

Harley-Davidson
 William A. Davidson, executive at Harley-Davidson Motor Company, brother of co-founders Arthur and Walter Davidson, and grandfather of Willie G. Davidson
 William H. Davidson (motorcyclist) (1905–1992), American motorcycle racer and president of Harley-Davidson Motorcycles
 Willie G. Davidson (William Godfrey Davidson, born 1933), former styling chief of Harley-Davidson and designer of the Harley-Davidson Super Glide

Military
 William Lee Davidson (1746–1781), American Revolutionary War officer, namesake of Davidson College
 William Davidson Bissett (1893–1971), Scottish recipient of the Victoria Cross

Sports
 Bill Davidson (American football, born 1915) (1915–1970), American football player
 Bill Davidson (American football, born 1935) (1935–1999), American football player and coach
 Bill Davidson (baseball) (1884–1954), outfielder in Major League Baseball (1909–1911)
 Bill Davidson (rugby league) (fl. 1914–1923), New Zealand rugby league player
 Will Davidson, UK footballer active in the 1890s
 William Davidson (sailor) (1876–1939), British competition sailor
 William Davidson (Scottish footballer) (fl. 1904–1914), Scottish footballer with Falkirk, Everton, etc
 William Davidson (Sussex cricketer) (1920–2015), English cricketer
 William Davidson (MCC cricketer) (1811–1894), English cricketer
 Kayak Bill (Bill Davidson, 1948–2004), Canadian rock climber

Others
 William Davidson (bishop) (1919–2006), bishop of the Episcopal Diocese of Western Kansas
 William B. Davidson (1888–1947), American actor
 William Mackay Davidson (1909–1991), Scottish haematologist and pathologist
 William Davidson (filmmaker) (1928–2009), Canadian filmmaker and TV creator
 William Leslie Davidson (1848–1929), Scottish philosopher
 William Taylor Davidson (1837–1915), owner and editor of the Fulton Democrat newspaper
 William Montgomery Davenport Davidson, Australian surveyor
 William Norman Lascelles Davidson, English cinematographer
 William Davidson (landscape gardener) (fl. 1860s)

See also
 William Davison (disambiguation)